Gauhar Afroz (also known as Gori) is a former Pakistani film actress. Gori acted in both Punjabi, Pashto and Urdu films including Hathiar (1979), Zara Si Baat (1982), Super Girl (1989), Mujrim (1989) and Chattan (1992).

Early life
Gori's parents were from Ahmedpur East and later they went to Multan there they settled and Gori was born as Gauhar Afroz in Multan, Pakistan on 14 September in 1965.

Career
In 1979 Gori started her career with her debut in Hathiar the film was a hit, starring with Sultan Rahi, Sabiha Khanum and Mustafa Qureshi. She was successful in 1980s and 1990s. Gori was very selective about her work and she worked in about 56 movies. After the decline of Urdu Cinema in early 2000s and in 2003 she worked in her last Punjabi film Khar Damagh Gujjar and quit the Pakistani film industry after the film was released.

Personal life
Gori's older sister Anjuman is an actress and she has one daughter.

Filmography

Film

See also
Anjuman

References

External links
 

1965 births
People from Multan
20th-century Pakistani actresses
Actresses in Punjabi cinema
Pakistani film actresses
Actresses in Urdu cinema
Actresses from Lahore
Living people
Actresses in Pashto cinema
21st-century Pakistani actresses